Robert Lee Rayford (February 3, 1953 – May 15 1969), sometimes identified as Robert R. due to his age, was an American teenager from Missouri who has been suggested to represent the earliest confirmed case of HIV/AIDS in North America. This is based on evidence published in 1988 in which the authors claimed that medical evidence indicated that he was "infected with a virus closely related or identical to human immunodeficiency virus type 1." Rayford died of pneumonia, but his other symptoms baffled the doctors who treated him. A study published in 1988 reported the detection of antibodies against HIV. Results of testing for HIV genetic material were reported once at a scientific conference in Australia in 1999; however, the data has never been published in a peer-reviewed medical or scientific journal.

Background

Robert Rayford was born on February 3, 1953, in St. Louis, Missouri to Constance Rayford (September 12, 1931 – April 3, 2011) and Joseph Benny Bell (March 24, 1924 – March 17, 1960). He had an older brother named George L. (November 20, 1951 – December 24, 2007). As a single parent, Constance had to raise both children by herself. The Rayfords lived in the Old North neighborhood of St. Louis, where the 19th-century brick homes provided affordable housing for several working class African-American families such as their own. Not much of Rayford's personal life was disclosed, other than he would be referred to as "Bobbie" and that he was described as being "painfully shy, mentally slow, maybe even intellectually disabled."

Illness 
In early 1968, Rayford, then 15 years old, admitted himself to the City Hospital in St. Louis. His legs and genitals were covered in warts and sores. He also had severe swelling of the testicles and pelvic region, which later spread to his legs, causing a misdiagnosis of lymphedema. 

He had grown thin and pale and suffered from shortness of breath. Rayford told the doctors that he had experienced these symptoms since at least late 1966. 

Tests discovered a severe chlamydia infection which had, unusually, spread throughout his body. Rayford declined a rectal examination request from hospital personnel, and was described as uncommunicative and withdrawn.  

Dr. Memory Elvin-Lewis, who was assigned to his case, would recall of his shy and somewhat hesitant personality: "He was the typical 15-year-old who is not going to talk to adults, especially when I'm white and he's black. He was not a communicative individual. He knew the minute I walked into the room that I wanted something more from him—more blood, more lymph fluid, more something." 

He had a tendency to contradict his statements regarding his sexual history; at one point boasting himself as "the stud of all time" and at another point claiming to have only had sexual intercourse once, that being with a young woman from his neighborhood, whom he attributed as the source of his illness.

Doctors treating Rayford suspected that he was an underage sex worker and the recipient of receptive anal intercourse, but never considered the possibility of him being a victim of child molestation.  Eventually, he was moved to Barnes-Jewish Hospital (then called Barnes Hospital).

In late 1968 Rayford's condition seemed to stabilize, but by March 1969 his symptoms reappeared and worsened. He had increased difficulty breathing and his white blood cell count had plummeted. The doctors found that his immune system was dysfunctional. He developed a fever and died of pneumonia at 11:20 pm on May 15, 1969.

Autopsy 
An autopsy of Rayford's body, which was led by William Drake, uncovered several abnormalities. Small purplish lesions were discovered on Rayford's left thigh along with soft tissue. Drake concluded that the lesions were Kaposi's sarcoma, a rare type of cancer which mostly affected elderly men of Mediterranean or Ashkenazi Jewish ancestry, but was almost unheard of among black teenagers. Kaposi's sarcoma was later designated an AIDS-defining illness.

These findings baffled the attending doctors, and a review of the case was published in the medical journal Lymphology in 1973.

Later investigations

Tests 
In 1984, HIV (originally called "lymphadenopathy-associated virus", or LAV) was first discovered and at the time of its discovery, it was rapidly spreading in the gay male communities of New York City and Los Angeles. Marlys Witte, one of the doctors who, like Elvin-Lewis, had cared for Rayford before his death and also assisted in the autopsy, thawed and tested tissue samples that were preserved after Rayford's autopsy, and the test results came back negative. Three years later, in June 1987, Witte decided to test the tissue samples again using Western blot, the most sensitive test then available. The Western blot test found that antibodies against all nine detectable HIV proteins were present in Rayford's blood. An antigen capture assay was also reported to have identified HIV antigens in tissue samples, but not in serum. In a letter to the scientific journal Nature in 1990, Robert F. Garry stated that efforts to directly detect HIV DNA were under way:

"Proviral DNA has recently been detected in his tissues by PCR in collaboration with J. Sninsky and S. Kwok (Cetus Corporation, Emeryville, California) but nucleotide sequence analysis is not yet complete."

A study which reported the results of testing for HIV DNA was eventually presented nearly a decade later, as a conference abstract in 1999. The abstract reports the detection of HIV genes in Rayford's samples which were very similar to the HIV IIIB isolate which was discovered in France in the 1980s, and became widely used as a laboratory reference isolate (this study has never been published in a peer-reviewed scientific journal). Neither John Sninsky nor Shirley Kwok was listed as an author on the abstract. The abstract argues that laboratory contamination by the HIV IIIB isolate was unlikely because the DNA testing was done on Rayford's samples without being cultured.

The last known tissue samples of Rayford were in a New Orleans lab and inadvertently destroyed during Hurricane Katrina in 2005, preventing further testing.

Impact on AIDS origin research 
Rayford never traveled outside the Midwestern United States and told doctors that he had never received a blood transfusion. If Rayford was indeed infected with HIV, as one group of researchers claims, the mode of acquisition is assumed to have been through sexual contact. Having never left the country, the researchers who claim that Rayford represented an early case of HIV infection presume that AIDS may have been present in North America before Rayford began to show symptoms of it in 1966. Rayford never ventured into cosmopolitan cities such as New York, Los Angeles, or San Francisco, where the HIV-AIDS epidemic was first observed in the United States. The only notable international connection to St. Louis is that it was TWA's main airline hub. Doctors and others who investigated the case in the early 1980s speculated that Rayford may have been sexually abused or a victim of  child prostitution.

See also 
 Arvid Noe, the earliest known European AIDS case
 Index case
 History of HIV/AIDS
 Timeline of early AIDS cases
 Timeline of HIV/AIDS

References 

1953 births
1969 deaths
Index cases
African-American people
American children
Deaths from pneumonia in Missouri
AIDS-related deaths in Missouri
HIV/AIDS in the United States
People from St. Louis